John Jesper Arvidsson (born 1 January 1985) is a Swedish footballer who plays for IF Brommapojkarna as a left back.

Career
Arvidsson started out his career at his hometown club Götene IF before he was signed by IF Elfsborg as a 15-year-old youth player in 2000. Five years later he was promoted to the first team but was unable to make a big impact. Instead he was sent out on several loan spells to second tier club Åtvidabergs FF where he became an important part of their effort to reestablish themselves in Allsvenskan. At the start of 2011 he left Elfsborg and signed a permanent contract with Åtvidaberg.

After the 2012 season Arvidsson wanted to sign with a Stockholm based club since he was living there and commuting to Åtvidaberg. He had talks with Superettan club Hammarby IF but ended up signing with Allsvenskan club Djurgården, saying that it was an easy choice for him since he wanted to remain in the top division of Swedish football.

International career
Arvidsson represented the Sweden national under-21 football team twice in 2006.

References

External links
 
 

1985 births
Living people
Swedish footballers
Sweden under-21 international footballers
Association football defenders
Allsvenskan players
Superettan players
IF Elfsborg players
Åtvidabergs FF players
Djurgårdens IF Fotboll players
Vålerenga Fotball players
IK Sirius Fotboll players
IF Brommapojkarna players
Eliteserien players
Swedish expatriate footballers
Expatriate footballers in Norway
Swedish expatriate sportspeople in Norway
Götene IF players
People from Götene Municipality
Sportspeople from Västra Götaland County